Mike Weddington  is a former professional American football player who played linebacker for five seasons for the Green Bay Packers. Prior to that, he began his career with three seasons for the New Jersey Generals of the United States Football League. Before playing in the NFL and attending Oklahoma University, Michael was approached by the Cincinnati Reds and Philadelphia Phillies. 

Michael has two children, Porscha and Christian. Porscha, his oldest child, played college basketball at the University of Kansas.

References

1960 births
American football linebackers
Green Bay Packers players
Oklahoma Sooners football players
New Jersey Generals players
Living people
People from Belton, Texas
Players of American football from Texas